Thymocyte nuclear protein 1 is a protein that in humans is encoded by the THYN1 gene.

This gene encodes a protein that is highly conserved among vertebrates and plant species and may be involved in the induction of apoptosis. Alternatively spliced transcript variants encoding different isoforms have been described.

References

Further reading